On Broadway (sometimes referred to as David Campbell On Broadway) is the sixth studio album from Australian singer/actor David Campbell, released in Australia on 2 April 2010. On Broadway marks a departure by Campbell from his previous albums of swing and rock music, back to the genre of musical theatre through which he first rose to fame. The album reached number seven on the Australian national ARIA chart.

The album was produced by leading musical director Rob Fisher and veteran arranger Bill Elliott, and recorded with a 40-piece orchestra at East West Studios, Los Angeles in January 2010.

An accompanying television documentary David Campbell On Broadway was filmed by Campbell's production company Luckiest Productions at the same time, and aired in Australia on arts channel STVDIO on Saturday 3 April.

Track listing
"Overture"
"Oh, What a Beautiful Mornin'" – from Oklahoma!
"When I Get My Name In Lights" – from Legs Diamond / The Boy From Oz
"Hey There" – from The Pajama Game
"Hello, Dolly!" – from Hello, Dolly!
"Bring Him Home" – from Les Misérables
"Being Alive" – from Company
"All I Care About" – from Chicago
"You'll Never Walk Alone" – from Carousel
"Proud Lady" – from The Baker's Wife
"Luck Be A Lady" – from Guys & Dolls
"What Kind Of Fool Am I?" – from Stop the World - I Want to Get Off
"Goodbye" – from Catch Me If You Can
"Some Other Time" – from On The Town

Charts and certifications

Weekly charts

Year-end charts

Certifications

References

2010 albums
Covers albums
David Campbell (Australian musician) albums
Sony Music Australia albums